Stephen John Coates (born July 2, 1950) is a Canadian retired professional ice hockey player. He is currently the radio color commentator for the Philadelphia Flyers on 97.5 The Fanatic, after spending 14 seasons with the Flyers television team.

Coates played five games in the National Hockey League with the Detroit Red Wings during the 1976–77 season. The rest of his career, which lasted from 1973 to 1980, was spent in the minor leagues.

Playing career
Coates' professional hockey career began when he signed with the Philadelphia Flyers in 1973 as a free agent after four seasons with the Michigan Tech Huskies. After playing in four seasons in the Flyers' minor league system, he was dealt to the Detroit Red Wings along with Terry Murray, Bob Ritchie, and Dave Kelly in exchange for Rick Lapointe and Mike Korney during the 1976–77 season. In five games for the Red Wings that season, he scored one goal for his only NHL point. He spent the next three years playing in the Central Hockey League (CHL) and the American Hockey League (AHL) before retiring.

Broadcasting career
Coates started his broadcasting career with the Flyers in 1980 as a radio color commentator, and switched over to television in 1999. He spent the next 14 seasons on television as a color commentator and between-the-benches reporter for the Flyers before moving back to radio at the start of the 2014–15 season.

"Coatesy's Corner"

From 1999 to 2011, Coates was the host of a short segment that aired during the first intermission of local Flyers television broadcasts, filmed prior to the game. These segments included interviews, explanations of NHL rules, analysis of current NHL events, and sometimes skits with Flyers players for comedic purposes. During the 2010–11 season, Coatesy's Corner began to air less and less and was eventually officially retired by the end of the season.

Personal life

Coates currently resides in Egg Harbor Township, New Jersey.

Career statistics

Regular season and playoffs

References

External links
 

1950 births
Living people
Canadian ice hockey right wingers
Des Moines Capitols players
Detroit Red Wings players
Kansas City Red Wings players
Maine Mariners players
Michigan Tech Huskies men's ice hockey players
National Hockey League broadcasters
People from Egg Harbor Township, New Jersey
Philadelphia Firebirds (AHL) players
Philadelphia Flyers announcers
Richmond Robins players
Ice hockey people from Toronto
Springfield Indians players
Syracuse Firebirds players
Undrafted National Hockey League players